The men's time trial was held on 21 March on a 40 km course on the St Kilda Foreshore and Beach Road.

Results

External links
 Results

Cycling at the 2006 Commonwealth Games
Road cycling at the Commonwealth Games
2006 in road cycling